The women's 800 metre freestyle event at the 2014 Asian Games took place on 25 September 2014 at Munhak Park Tae-hwan Aquatics Center.

Schedule
All times are Korea Standard Time (UTC+09:00)

Records

Results

References

Results

External links
Official website

Swimming at the 2014 Asian Games